The United Arab Emirates Rugby Federation, or UAE Rugby, is the governing body for rugby union in United Arab Emirates. It organises and oversees local rugby, including the annual Dubai Sevens and Dubai Women's Sevens. It became affiliated to World Rugby (then known as IRB) and Asia Rugby in 2012 as a full status member.

History
Prior to the establishment of a national governing body for UAE, rugby across the Arabian Peninsula was administered by the Arabian Gulf Rugby Football Union (AGRFU) which had been founded in 1974 and oversaw rugby until the end of 2010 in 6 member countries: UAE, Kuwait, Saudi Arabia, Bahrain, Oman and Qatar.

World Rugby's governance restructuring project for the West Asia region resulted in AGRFU being broken up into separate unions for each member country. The UAE Rugby Federation was the first to be formed in 2009 and the UAE national team inherited the former Arabian Gulf team's world ranking. 

In 2021, UAE Rugby signed an agreement with GymNation as their new UAE Rugby Federation Representative 15s and 7s teams' official sponsor, providing gym access to all UAE Rugby players

Board of Directors 
The federation was established by Chairman's Office decree No. 20 of the General Authority for Sports in 2009. It is chaired by Sheikh Mohammed bin Maktoum bin Juma Al Maktoum. The board of directors for 2016-2021 is as follows:

 Faisal Abdulaziz Alzarooni - Vice Chairman
 Qais Abdulla Aldhalai - Vice Chairman
 Mohamed Sultan Alzaabi - Secretary General
 Saood Belshalat - Treasurer
 Mohammad Ahmed Shaker - Board Member
 Salman Mahmood Hadi - Board Member
 Fawzia Mohammed Faridoon - Board Member
 Ibrahim Nasser Buhamer - Board Member

Management 

 Executive Director - Hazem Hassan
 High Performance Manager - Apollo Perelini
 Training and Education Manager - Sami Smara
 Support Services Manager - Nezar Mehran

See also
United Arab Emirates national rugby union team
Rugby union in the United Arab Emirates
United Arab Emirates national rugby league team

References 

Rugby union governing bodies in Asia
Rugby
Sports organizations established in 2009
2009 establishments in the United Arab Emirates